Sheol is the third studio album by Swedish black metal band Naglfar. It was released on 24 March 2003 through Century Media Records and New Hawen Records. It was their first full-length album in five years, after Diabolical (1998).

Reception

Laura Taylor of Exclaim! said that Sheol is "as melodic as it is brutal", and called it "an unrelenting attack on the senses". She noted that the album "starts to lose effectiveness towards the...end". Rock Hard gave it a 10/10 score, and in 2005, Sheol was ranked number 407 in Rock Hard magazine's book The 500 Greatest Rock & Metal Albums of All Time. Metal.de gave it an 8/10 score, and Blabbermouth.net a 7.5/10.

Track listing

Personnel

Naglfar
 Jens Rydén – vocals, keyboards, layout, logo, additional artwork
 Kristoffer Olivius – bass, vocals
 Andreas Nilsson – guitars
 Marcus E. Norman – guitars, keyboards
 Mattias Grahn – drums

Additional personnel
 Nils Johansson – engineering, additional keyboards
 Ingrid Sjöberg – photography

References

2003 albums
Century Media Records albums
Naglfar (band) albums